Una parte di me may refer to:

Una parte di me (Nek album), 2005 album by Italian singer-songwriter Nek
"Una parte di me" (Nek song), title track from the above album
Una parte di me (Amaury Vassili album), 2012 album by French singer Amaury Vassili 
"Una parte di me" (Amaury Vassili song), title track from the above album

See also
"Sei parte di me", song by Zero Assoluto